El Legado (en: "The Legacy") is the debut album by power metal band DarkSun, released in 2004. In the middle of 2003, DarkSun went to Germany to record what would become their debut album. It was recorded at VPS Studios, produced by Ingo Cjavkoski (better known as Rage's producer), and mixed at House of Music Studios by Achim Köhler (mixer who had worked for bands like Primal Fear and Sinner).

El Legado was released in July 2004, receiving very good reviews, and stating that El Legado, was "one of the best Spanish metal albums of the year [...] from an excellent band". DarkSun toured Spain for a whole year to support the album, and had "tickets-sold-out" posters in most of the venues. The critics and live-reviews about this new band were incredibly good. In the middle of the tour, drummer Daniel Cabal left the band. The rest of the members had to cancel some concerts before introducing Cabal's replacement, drummer Rafael Yugueros who was at that time known for his work on power metal band Darna, on their first and second album and left after the band's breakup in 2004. When the tour ended DarkSun entered the studios once again to record their new album.

Track listing
Más allá del Arco Iris
El legado
La traición
Veo la luz
El bosque encantado
Dentro de ti
A donde van las almas
El último viaje
La llama inmortal
Corazón de dragón
Gloria y poder

Members 

 Dani González - vocals, guitars
 Tino Hevia - guitars
 Pedro Junquera - bass
 Helena Pinto - keyboards
 Daniel Cabal - drums

Additional musicians 
 Kiko Loureiro - first guitar solo on "Corazón de dragón"
 Santiago Alvarez - guitar solo on "A donde van las almas"

External links 
 DarkSun's Website

2004 debut albums
DarkSun albums